Clare McCabe is an American chemical engineer who is Cornelius Vanderbilt Chair of Engineering and Professor of Engineering at Vanderbilt University. She was elected Fellow of the American Association for the Advancement of Science in 2019. Her research makes use of molecular modelling to understand the properties of biological systems, fluids and nanomaterials.

Early life and education 
McCabe completed her undergraduate training in the United Kingdom. She first specialised in chemistry at the University of Sheffield, and then concentrated on physical chemistry for her doctoral research.

Research and career 
In 2002, McCabe joined the faculty at the Colorado School of Mines as an Assistant Professor. She joined Vanderbilt University in 2004, where she was eventually made the Cornelius Vanderbilt Professor of Engineering. Her early research considered ionic liquids. In particular, McCabe sought to develop a framework that allowed the modelling and simulation of ionic liquids, both as neat materials and in blend systems.

McCabe is interested in lipid self-assembly, nanoscale tribology and molecular thermodynamics. She makes use of molecular modelling and better understand real-world applications.

Awards and honours 
 2011 Madison Sarratt Prize for Excellence in Undergraduate Teaching
 2014 Vanderbilt Institute for Nanoscience and Engineering Distinguished Service Award
 2016 American Institute of Chemical Engineers Computational Molecular Science and Engineering Forum (CoMSEF) Impact Award
 2018 Chancellor's Award for Research
 2019 Elected Fellow of the American Association for the Advancement of Science

Selected publications

References 

Living people
Year of birth missing (living people)
American chemical engineers
American women engineers
Fellows of the American Association for the Advancement of Science
Colorado School of Mines faculty
Vanderbilt University faculty
Alumni of the University of Sheffield